Mary Milne (1914-2014) married name Dumbrill, was a female athlete who competed for England.

Athletics career
She competed for England in the high jump at the 1934 British Empire Games in London.

Milne was a three times AAA outdoor champion (in 1932, 1933 and 1935) and the highest British athlete on a further two occasions (in 1930 and 1934, the winners of those two championships being Carolina Gisolf of the Netherlands and Margaret Bergmann of Germany respectively).

Personal life
Mary Milne married Leonard Dumbrill in 1935.

References

1914 births
2014 deaths
English female high jumpers
Athletes (track and field) at the 1934 British Empire Games
Commonwealth Games competitors for England